The 84th Bombardment Squadron is an inactive United States Air Force unit.  It was last assigned to the post-World War II-era 47th Bombardment Wing, stationed at RAF Sculthorpe, England.  It was inactivated on 22 June 1962.

History
Antisubmarine patrols, Dec 1941-Jan 1942. Combat in MTO, 22 Jan 1943 – 30 Apr 1945.  Cold War NATO tactical bombardment squadron.  See 47th Operations Group for extended history.

Lineage
 Constituted as the 84th Bombardment Squadron (Light) on 20 Nov 1940
 Activated on 15 Jan 1941
 Redesignated 84th Bombardment Squadron, Light on 20 August 1943
 Redesignated 84th Bombardment Squadron, Light (Night Intruder) on 16 April 1946
 Redesignated 84th Bombardment Squadron, Light, Jet on 23 June 1948
 Redesignated 84th Bombardment Squadron, Light c. 16 November 1950
 Redesignated 84th Bombardment Squadron, Tactical on 1 October 1955
 Discontinued, and inactivated, on 22 Jun 1962

Assignments
 47th Bombardment Group, 15 January 1941
 Twelfth Air Force, 2 October 1949
 Ninth Air Force, 17 October 1949 (attached to 363d Tactical Reconnaissance Group)
 Tactical Air Command, 1 August 1950 (attached to 363d Tactical Reconnaissance Wing after 1 September 1950)
 47th Bombardment Group, 12 March 1951
 47th Bombardment Wing, 8 February 1955 – 22 June 1962

Stations

 McChord Field, Washington, 15 January 1941
 Fresno Army Air Base, California, 11 August 1941
 Will Rogers Field, Oklahoma, 17 February 1942
 Greensboro Army Air Base, North Carolina, 16 July–c. 17 October 1942
 Médiouna Airfield, French Morocco, c. 18 November 1942
 Youks-les-Bains Airfield, Algeria, 6 January 1943
 Canrobert Airfield, Algeria, 29 March 1943
 Thelepte Airfield, Tunisia, 5 April 1943
 Souk-el-Arba Airfield, Tunisia, 13 April 1943
 Soliman Airfield, Tunisia, c. 1 June 1943
 RAF Hal Far, Malta, 21 July 1943
 Torrente Comunelli Airfield, Sicily, 10 August 1943
 Gerbini Airfield, Sicily, 20 August 1943
 Grottaglie Airfield, Italy, 24 September 1943
 Vincenzo Airfield, Italy, 15 October 1943
 Vesuvius Airfield, Italy, 11 January 1944

 Capodichino Airport, Italy, 22 March 1944
 Vesuvius Airfield, Italy, 25 April 1944
 Ponte Galeria Airfield, Italy, 10 June 1944
 Ombrone Airfield, Italy, 24 June 1944
 Poretta Airfield, Corsica, 15 July 1944
 Salon-de-Provence Air Base, France, 5 September 1944
 Follonica Airfield, Italy, 22 September 1944
 Rosignano Airfield, Italy, 4 October 1944
 Grosseto Airfield, Italy 2 January 1945
 Pisa Airfield, Italy, 17–22 June 1945
 Seymour Johnson Field, North Carolina, c. 12 July 1945
 Lake Charles Army Air Field, Louisiana, 9 September 1945
 Biggs Field, Texas, 20 October 1946
 Barksdale Air Force Base, Louisiana, 19 November 1948
 Langley Air Force Base, Virginia, 17 October 1949 – 21 May 1952
 RAF Sculthorpe, England, 31 May 1952 – 22 June 1962

Aircraft
 Douglas B-18 Bolo, 1941-1942
 Douglas A-20 Havoc, 1942-1945
 Douglas A-26 Invader (later B-26), 1945-1949
 North American B-45 Tornado, 1949-1957
 Douglas B-66 Destroyer, 1958-1962

References

Notes

Bibliography

 
 
 

Military units and formations established in 1941
084
084